Kobru is a village in Lääne-Harju Parish, Harju County in northern Estonia.

References

 

Villages in Harju County